Archimedes – "The Open CAD" – (also called Arquimedes) is a computer-aided design (CAD) program being developed with direct input from architects and architecture firms. With this design philosophy, the developers hope to create software better suited for architecture than the currently widely used AutoCAD, and other available CAD software. The program is free software released under the Eclipse Public License.

Features
 Basic drawing 
 Lines, Polylines, Arcs and Circles.
 Editable Text
 Explode
 Offset
 Advanced CAD functions
 Trimming
 Filleting
 Area measurement
 Miscellaneous
 Autosave
 SVG export
 PDF export
 English, Portuguese, and Italian language support

Integration with other CAD systems
Archimedes uses its own XML-based open format, which resembles SVG. It does not yet include support for other CAD formats, but DXF support is planned.

Development
Archimedes is written in Java, and the latest version runs on Windows, Mac OS X, Linux/Unix based systems, and might run on platforms that are supported by LWJGL and a Java Virtual machine on version 1.5.0 or later.

History
The Archimedes Project started as a collaboration between a group of programmers and architecture students at the University of São Paulo, in Brazil, in 2005.  The project is currently being worked on as free and open source software. There is a team of students from the University working on it as collaborators under the coordination of Hugo (project leader) but everyone is free to contribute with plugins and/or patches.

Timeline
 Archimedes was registered as a SourceForge.net project on July 12, 2005.
 The last stable pre-RCP version was 0.16.0, released on October 25, 2000.

 The first stable version after the RCP migration was 0.50.0, released on April 25, 2007.

Migration to Eclipse RCP in version 0.5x
A migration to the Eclipse Rich Client Platform in versions 0.5x has greatly improved the user interface model and stability, but some of the functionality from the last pre-RCP version is still being transferred. Version 0.58.0 moved this process a step closer by adding trimming, leader, svg and pdf exporting.

External links
 Archimedes Home Page
 Archimedes on SourceForge.net
 Hugo Corbucci's Blog (Archimedes Project Lead)
 Github Repository

References

Computer-aided design software for Linux
Free computer-aided design software
Free software programmed in Java (programming language)